"The Last Garrison" is the first single taken from the fourth studio album by British rock band Enter Shikari, The Mindsweep. The song was first played on Zane Lowe's BBC Radio 1 show on 20 October 2014, while the single was released on iTunes and Spotify on the same day.

Music video
The music video, directed by Oleg Rooz, was released on the band's official YouTube page on 11 November 2014.

Track listing

Band members
Roughton "Rou" Reynolds – lead vocals, synthesizer, keyboards, programming
Liam "Rory" Clewlow – guitar, vocals
Chris Batten – bass guitar, vocals
Rob Rolfe – drums, percussion, backing vocals

Chart performance

References

Enter Shikari songs
2014 singles
2014 songs
PIAS Recordings singles